Carver Glacier is in the U.S. state of Oregon. The glacier is situated in the Cascade Range at an elevation near , just east of Skinner Glacier. Carver Glacier is on the north slopes of South Sister, a dormant stratovolcano.

See also
 List of glaciers in the United States

References

Glaciers of Oregon
Glaciers of Deschutes County, Oregon